Grant Connell and Patrick Galbraith were the defending champions.

Connell and Galbraith successfully their title, defeating Byron Black and Jonathan Stark 6–3, 3–6, 6–4 in the final.

Seeds
All seeds receive a bye into the second round.

Draw

Finals

Top half

Bottom half

References
Draw

1994 in Japanese tennis
1994 ATP Tour
Tokyo Indoor